Aoteatilia is a genus of sea snails, marine gastropod mollusks in the family Columbellidae.

Species
Species within the genus Aoteatilia include:
 Aoteatilia acicula (Suter, 1908)
 Aoteatilia amphipsila (Suter, 1908)
 Aoteatilia caledonica K. Monsecour & D. Monsecour, 2016
 Aoteatilia larochei Powell, 1940
 Aoteatilia psila (Suter, 1908)
 Aoteatilia rimatara K. Monsecour & D. Monsecour, 2018
 Aoteatilia substriata (Suter, 1899)
 Aoteatilia tenuistriata (Suter, 1908)

References

 Suter, H. (1908b) Result of dredging for Mollusca near Cuvier Island, with descriptions of new species. Transactions and Proceedings of the New Zealand Institute, 40, 344–359, pls. 26–27, 30.

External links

 
Columbellidae
Gastropod genera